Alireza Kazemi born in Mashhad was the former Deputy Minister of Education of Iran and the head of the Ministry of Education of Iran in the government of Ebrahim Raisi.

References 

Education ministers of Iran
Living people

Iranian schoolteachers
1965 births
People from Mashhad
Iranian politicians